Hassan Nazeem (born 24 May 2001) nicknamed "Choatu", is a Maldivian footballer who plays as a forward for Foakaidhoo and the Maldives national team.

International career
Nazeem made his debut for Maldives on 5 September 2019 in the 2022 FIFA World Cup qualifiers match against Guam, as a 69th minute substitute replacing Asadhulla Abdulla.

References

External links
 
 

2001 births
Living people
Maldivian footballers
Association football forwards
Maldives international footballers
Club Eagles players